Silent Weapons for Quiet Wars is the debut studio album by American hip hop group Killarmy. It was released on August 5, 1997 through Wu-Tang/Priority Records.

Background
Recording sessions took place at 36 Chambers Studio in Manhattan and 4th Chamber Studio in Stuebenville. Production was mainly handled by member 4th Disciple, except for two tracks that were produced by the RZA, who also served as executive producer. It features guest appearances from Hell Razah, Masta Killa, Prodigal Sunn and Streetlife. The album features the singles "Camouflage Ninjas" b/w "Wake Up" and "Wu-Renegades" b/w "Clash of the Titans".

The group consists of six rappers: Killa Sin, Beretta 9, Islord, 9th Prince, P.R. Terrorist and ShoGun Assasson; and one producer, 4th Disciple, who produced the majority of the album. Like Black Lung's album of the same name, the title was taken from a document that came to light in the mid-1980s detailing an alleged New-World Order plan for world domination, a topic that was explored in Milton William Cooper's controversial book Behold a Pale Horse.

Reception
Silent Weapons initially received mixed reviews from critics, who saw the group as a low-rent version of the Wu-Tang Clan because of similarities in the group's street-oriented Five-Percenter rhymes and dark production. The album was well received by Wu-Tang and underground hip hop fans—acclaimed for its unique combat themes and stellar production work. The album peaked at number 34 on the Billboard 200 and number 10 on the Top R&B/Hip-Hop Albums in the United States.

Track listing

Personnel
Terrance "9th Prince" Hamlin – performer (tracks: 1-6, 8, 10, 11, 14-17)
Jamal "ShoGun Assasson" Alexander – performer (tracks: 1, 2, 4, 6, 9, 12-14, 16, 17)
Jeryl "Killa Sin" Grant – performer (tracks: 1, 3, 6, 8-11, 15, 16)
Domingo "Dom Pachino" Del Valle – performer (tracks: 2, 4, 6, 9, 10, 12, 14, 15, 17)
Samuel "Beretta 9" Murray – performer (tracks: 2, 4, 9, 10, 12-14, 16, 17)
Rodney "Islord" Stevenson – performer (tracks: 5, 8)
Patrick "StreetLife" Charles – performer (track 2)
Chron "Hell Razah" Smith – performer (track 8)
Vergil "Prodigal Sunn" Ruff – performer (track 8)
Elgin "Masta Killa" Turner – performer (track 17)
Selwyn "4th Disciple" Bougard – producer (tracks: 1-7, 9-15, 17), co-producer (track 16), engineering, mixing
Robert "RZA" Diggs – producer (tracks: 8, 16), executive producer
Joseph M. Palmaccio – mastering
Ney "Flava" Pimentel – art direction, design, layout
David Corio – photography
Mitchell "Divine Justice" Diggs – coordinator, supervisor
Sherin Baday – coordinator, supervisor

Charts

References

External links

Killarmy albums
1997 debut albums
Albums produced by RZA
Priority Records albums
Albums produced by 4th Disciple